Carol Annette "Annie" Petsonk is an American attorney who is the Assistant Secretary of Transportation for Aviation and International Affairs in the Biden administration. Petsonk was confirmed by the U.S. Senate in a voice vote on May 18, 2022.

Education 
Pentsonk began her undergraduate education at Harvard University before transferring to Colorado College, where she earned a Bachelor of Arts degree in 1979. She then earned a Juris Doctor from Harvard Law School.

Career 
After graduating from law school, Pentsonk worked in the United States Department of Justice and Office of the United States Trade Representative, where she worked on issues related to trade and environmental policy. She has also worked at the United Nations Environment Programme and as a law professor at the George Washington University Law School. Prior to the start of the Biden administration, was the international counsel for the Environmental Defense Fund.

References 

Living people
Colorado College alumni
Harvard Law School alumni
Colorado lawyers
Biden administration personnel
George Washington University Law School faculty
United States Department of Justice officials
United States Department of Justice lawyers
Year of birth missing (living people)